A crown prince or hereditary prince is the heir apparent to the throne in a royal or imperial monarchy. The female form of the title is crown princess, which may refer either to an heiress apparent or, especially in earlier times, to the wife of the person styled crown prince.

Crown prince as a descriptive term has been used throughout history for the prince who is first-in-line to a throne and is expected to succeed (i.e. the heir apparent), barring any unforeseen future event preventing this. In certain monarchies, a more specific substantive title may be accorded and become associated with the position of heir apparent (e.g. Prince of Wales in the United Kingdom or Prince of Asturias in the Kingdom of Spain). In these monarchies, the term crown prince may be used less often than the substantive title (or never).

Until the late twentieth century, no modern monarchy adopted a system whereby females would be guaranteed to succeed to the throne (i.e. absolute primogeniture). A crown princess would therefore be more likely to refer to the spouse of a crown prince. She would be styled crown princess, not in her own right but by courtesy.

Description
The term crown prince is not used in European monarchies where the hereditary sovereign holds a title below that of king/queen or emperor/empress (such as grand duke or prince), although it is sometimes used as a synonym for heir apparent.

In Europe, where primogeniture governed succession to all monarchies except those of the Papacy and Andorra, the eldest son or (more recently) eldest child of the current monarch fills the role of crown prince or princess, depending upon whether females of the dynasty enjoy personal succession rights. Male precedence has been abolished in Belgium, Denmark, Luxembourg, Norway, Sweden, the Netherlands and the United Kingdom. The eldest living child of a monarch is sometimes not the heir apparent or crown prince, because that position can be held by a descendant of a deceased older child who, by "right of representation", inherits the same place in the line of succession that would be held by the ancestor if he or she were still living (for example, Carl Gustaf, Duke of Jämtland was the crown prince of Sweden from 1950 to 1973, as the senior grandson by male primogeniture of King Gustaf VI Adolf of Sweden, although the former Prince Sigvard, Duke of Uppland was Gustaf VI Adolf's eldest living son, and Prince Bertil, Duke of Halland his eldest living dynastic son during those years).

In some monarchies, those of the Middle East for example, in which primogeniture is not the decisive factor in dynastic succession, a person may not possess the title or status of crown prince by right of birth, but may obtain (and lose) it as a result of an official designation made on some other legal or traditional basis, such as former crown prince Hassan bin Talal of Jordan.

Compare heir apparent and heir presumptive. In Scandinavian kingdoms, the heir presumptive to the crown may hold a different title from an heir apparent: hereditary prince (German: Erbprinz, French: prince héréditaire). It is also the title borne by the heir apparent of Liechtenstein, as well as the heir apparent or presumptive of Monaco. In Luxembourg, the heir apparent bears the title of hereditary grand duke (German: Erbgroßherzog, Luxembourgish: ierfgroussherzog); along with hereditary prince, it was also the title borne by the heirs apparent to the thrones of the grand duchies, sovereign duchies and principalities, and of mediatized princely families in the German monarchies abolished in 1918.

Substantive traditional titles
Many monarchies use or did use substantive titles for their heirs apparent, often of historical origin:

Bey Al Mahalla (Kingdom of Tunisia)
Dauphin (Kingdom of France)
Duke of Brabant (Belgium)
Duke of Braganza (Kingdom of Portugal)
Duke of Cornwall (Kingdom of England), currently one of the titles of the Prince of Wales
Duke of Rothesay (Kingdom of Scotland), currently used by the Prince of Wales in place of his Welsh title when in Scotland
Earl of Carrick (Kingdom of Scotland), currently one of the titles of the Prince of Wales when in Scotland
Grand Prince (Grand Duchy of Tuscany)
Lord of the Isles (Kingdom of Scotland), currently one of the titles of the Prince of Wales when in Scotland
Margrave of Moravia (Kingdom of Bohemia)
Prince of Asturias (Castile & Spain), also used by heir presumptives
Prince of Girona (Aragon & Spain)
Prince Imperial or Prince Napoléon (French Empire)
Prince Imperial (Empire of Brazil)
Prince Imperial (Mexican Empire)
Prince of Orange (Netherlands), whether or not the equivalent title is held by the spouse of the titleholder is decided by the Dutch parliament (e.g., Queen Máxima of the Netherlands was never titled Princess of Orange by marriage for this reason)
Prince of Piedmont (Kingdom of Sardinia, and then Kingdom of Italy, when it was alternated with Prince of Naples) once conferred by King  Joseph Bonaparte
Prince Royal (France in 1789–1791 and the July Monarchy, and Portugal since 1815)
Prince of Turnovo (Kingdom of Bulgaria)
Prince of Viana (Navarre & Spain)
Rex iunior (Kingdom of Hungary), lit. junior king as he was crowned during the life of the incumbent king
Tsesarevich (Russia)
Tsarevich (Russia)
Królewicz (Poland)
Prince du sang (France)
Infante (Spain)

Some monarchies have used (although not always de jure) a territorial title for heirs apparent which, though often perceived as a crown princely title, is not automatically hereditary. It generally requires a specific conferral by the sovereign, which may be withheld.

Current and past titles in this category include:
Caesar or Kaisar (Roman and early Byzantine Empires) in honor of Gaius Julius Caesar, distinguished from the senior Augustus
Symbasileus (late Byzantine Empire), lit. co-emperor but still distinguished from the senior who was addressed as Autocrator
Aetheling (Anglo-Saxon England) and edling (Welsh kingdoms), lit. of the royal family
Duke of Estonia and Lolland (Denmark; during, at least, reigns of Christopher II and Valdemar IV)
Prince of Norway (Denmark-Norway); in 15th–19th centuries
Duke of Valentinois, used by several heirs to the Monégasque throne
Prince of Wales and Earl of Chester (England, Great Britain, United Kingdom)
King of the Romans (Holy Roman Empire) – an elective, rather than an inherited title, for the designated successor—usually the son, but sometimes the brother—of the Emperor
King of Rome (First French Empire)
Duke of Sparta (Kingdom of Greece); used briefly, within Greece, only by Prince Constantine, during the reign of his father King George I
Marquess of Baux, used by several heirs to the Monégasque throne
Prince of Brazil (title of the Portuguese heir from 1645 to 1815)
Duke of Scania (Sweden during the time when Magnus IV of Sweden also was King of Terra Scania)
Prince of Ani (Kingdom of West Armenia)
Prince of Alba Iulia (Kingdom of Romania)
Grand Voivode of Grahovo (Kingdom of Montenegro)
Prince of Venice (see Prince Eugène de Beauharnais); for the heir presumptive to Napoleon I in his Kingdom of Italy
Duke of Calabria (Kingdom of Naples and Kingdom of the Two Sicilies); prior to the accession of King Robert the title of the Neapolitan heir was Prince of Salerno
 Pangeran Adipati Anom (House of Mataram)

Modern Crown Princes and Princesses

Currently, the following states use the term "crown prince" (or "crown princess") for the heirs apparent to their thrones:

Bahrain – Crown Prince (Wali al-Ahd) Salman bin Hamad bin Isa Al Khalifa
Belgium – Crown Princess Elisabeth, Duchess of Brabant
Brunei – Crown Prince (Pengiran Muda Mahkota) Al-Muhtadee Billah
Eswatini – (position of Crown Prince currently vacant)
Denmark – (Kronprins) Crown Prince Frederik, Count of Montpezat
Japan – Crown Prince Akishino
Jordan – (Wali al-Ahd) Crown Prince Hussein 
Kuwait – (Wali al-Ahd) (Crown Prince) Sheikh Mishal Al-Ahmad Al-Jaber Al-Sabah
Malaysia: Deputy Yang di-Pertuan Agong (Timbalan Yang di-Pertuan Agong) Nazrin Shah of Perak
Johor – Crown Prince (Tunku Mahkota) Tunku Ismail Idris ibni Sultan Ibrahim Ismail
Kedah – Crown Prince (Raja Muda) Tunku Sarafuddin Badlishah Sultan Sallehuddin 
Kelantan – Crown Prince (Tengku Mahkota) Tengku Muhammad Faiz Petra ibni Sultan Ismail Petra
Negeri Sembilan – none, but there are 4 senior princes
Pahang – Crown Prince (Tengku Mahkota) Tengku Hassanal Ibrahim Alam Shah ibni Al-Sultan Abdullah
Perak – Crown Prince (Raja Muda) Raja Jaafar ibni Raja Muda Musa
Perlis – Crown Prince (Raja Muda) Tuanku Syed Faizuddin Putra Jamalullail
Selangor – Crown Prince (Raja Muda) Tengku Amir Shah ibni Sultan Sharafuddin Idris Shah
Terengganu – Crown Prince (Yang di-Pertuan Muda) Tengku Muhammad Ismail ibni Sultan Mizan Zainal Abidin
Morocco – Crown Prince (Wali al-Ahd) Moulay Hassan
Netherlands – (Prinses van Oranje) Crown Princess Catharina-Amalia
Norway – (Kronprins) Crown Prince Haakon
Oman – (Wali al-Ahd)Theyazin bin Haitham, Crown Prince of Oman
Saudi Arabia – Crown Prince (Wali al-Ahd) Mohammed bin Salman
Spain - (Princesa de Asturias) Leonor, Princess of Asturias, heir presumptive 
Sweden – (Kronprinsessa) Crown Princess Victoria, Duchess of Västergötland
Thailand – (position of Crown Prince currently vacant)
Tonga – Crown Prince Tupoutoʻa ʻUlukalala
United Arab Emirates: each of the constituent emirates of the U.A.E. uses the title of 'Crown Prince' for their heirs apparent:
Abu Dhabi – Crown Prince (Wali al-Ahd) Hamdan bin Zayed bin Sultan Al Nahyan
Dubai – Crown Prince (Wali al-Ahd) Hamdan bin Mohammed bin Rashid Al Maktoum
Fujairah – Crown Prince (Wali al-Ahd) Mohammed bin Hamad bin Mohammed Al Sharqi
Ajman – Crown Prince (Wali al-Ahd) Ammar bin Humaid Al Nuaimi
Ras Al-Khamiah – Crown Prince (Wali al-Ahd) Muhammed bin Saud bin Saqr Al Qasimi
Sharjah – Crown Prince (Wali al-Ahd) Sultan bin Muhammad bin Sultan Al Qasimi
Umm al-Quwain – Crown Prince (Wali al Ahd) Rashid bin Saud bin Rashid Al Mua'lla

In addition; the following heirs apparent to deposed monarchies use the title of Crown Prince as a title used by international courtesy:

Ahmad Shah Khan, Crown Prince of Afghanistan
Pavlos, Crown Prince of Greece.
Reza Pahlavi, Crown Prince of Iran.
Paras, Crown Prince of Nepal
Alexander, Crown Prince of Yugoslavia

Other specific traditions
 Ancient Egypt, Prince of the Sa'id, meaning Prince of Upper Egypt

 In Islamic tradition, the title is Wali al-Ahd.
 In Persia (Iran), during the Pahlavi dynasty and Qajar dynasty, the full style was Vala Hazrat-i-Humayun Vali Ahd, Shahzada (given name), (in Persian: والاحضرت همایون ولایتعهد) i.e. His August Imperial Highness the Heir Apparent, Prince ...;
 The title was adopted by many oriental monarchies, even some non-Muslim, e.g. Walet as alternative title for the Nepali (Hindu) royal heir apparent; first used Crown Prince Trailokya in the middle of the nineteenth century, taken from the Mughal title 'Vali Ahd'

Hindu tradition (Indian subcontinent):
Yuvaraja was part of the full title in many princely states of India, e.g.
in Jammu and Kashmir, the heir apparent was styled Maharaj Kumar Shri Yuvaraj (personal name) Singhji Bahadur
Tika
Nepal, where the King was styled Maharajadhiraja:
the heir apparent was styled: Sri Sri Sri Sri Sri Yuvarajadhiraj ('Young King of Kings', i.e. Crown Prince) (personal name) Bir Bikram Shah Deva;
the eldest son of the heir apparent was styled: Sri Sri Sri Sri Sri Nava Yuvaraj ('Young Crown Prince') (personal name) Bir Bikram Shah Deva

East Asian traditions:
The cognates of Chinese Huang Taizi (皇太子, "Great Imperial Son") – if a son of the reigning emperor,  and Huang Taisun (皇太孫, Great Imperial Grandson) – if a grandson of the emperor:

The crown prince of an emperor was sometimes referred as Dong-gong (東宮, 'East Palace') due to the location of his residence from the main palace. 
If the crown prince is the son of a king, he was called 世子 (Shizi).
The crown prince was not necessarily the first-born son.
During the Joseon Dynasty in Korea, the crown prince was often referred as Dong-gung (동궁, 東宮, 'East Palace') or wangseja (王世子 왕세자); The first-born son was called wonja (元子 원자).

Southeast Asian traditions: 
Siam Makutrajakuman (สยามมกุฎราชกุมาร) in Thailand since 1886.
Krom Phrarajawangboworn Sathanmongkol or Phra Maha Uparaja or commonly called Wang Na (or Front Palace) in Thailand prior to 1886.
Kanjeng Gusti Pangeran Adipati Anom in Yogyakarta sultanate and Surakarta, Indonesia.
Raja Muda or Tengku Mahkota in the Malay sultanates of Malaysia.
Pengiran Muda Mahkota in Brunei
 
Equivalents in other cultures:
Jaguar Prince (Mesoamerica)
Ka Haku O Hawaii or "The Lord of Hawaii" in the Hawaiian language.
Aremo, "First Son and Heir" in the Yoruba language of West Africa, used as a royal title in many of the kingdoms of the region.
Lee Jae-yong, South Korean billionaire and Chairman of Samsung referred to as the "Crown Prince of Samsung"

See also
 Caesar (title) (since the tetrarchy) and Consors imperii
 Princeps iuventutis
 Prince of the blood
 "Crown Prince Party" of the People's Republic of China
 List of heirs apparent
Taizi
Yuvraj

Notes

References

Royal titles
 
Crown prince
bn:যুবরাজ